Glendale Colony is a census-designated place (CDP) and Hutterite colony in Spink County, South Dakota, United States. It was first listed as a CDP prior to the 2020 census. The population of the CDP was 176 at the 2020 census.

It is in the southern part of the county, on the east side of the James River.

Demographics

References 

Census-designated places in Spink County, South Dakota
Census-designated places in South Dakota
Hutterite communities in the United States